Eleutherobin is a marine diterpene glycoside with in vitro anticancer activity.

References

External links 
 

Diterpene glycosides
Alkene derivatives
Vicinal diols
Acetate esters
Carboxylate esters
Isopropyl compounds
Imidazoles
Enones
Tetrahydropyrans